The Historic Villages of Portugal (Aldeias Históricas de Portugal) are a group of 12 villages classified under a 1991 government program called the Historic Villages Program (Programa de Aldeias Históricas). The aim of the program was to restore and promote a series of ancient villages/human settlements important to the history of Portugal.
Starting in 1991 the government included 10 villages located in the Beira Interior in the Historic Villages program:
 Almeida
 Castelo Mendo
 Castelo Novo
 Castelo Rodrigo
 Idanha-a-Velha
 Linhares da Beira
 Marialva
 Monsanto
 Piódão
 Sortelha

An additional 2 villages were added to the program in 2003:
 Belmonte
 Trancoso

References

External links 

 Official Website of the Aldeias Históricas de Portugal (Portuguese, English, Spanish and French versions)
 Website of the Aldeias Históricas de Portugal friends association

Villages in Portugal
Historiography of Portugal
Architecture in Portugal